Antlerite is a greenish hydrous copper sulfate mineral, with the formula Cu3(SO4)(OH)4. It occurs in tabular, acicular, or fibrous crystals with a vitreous luster. Originally believed to be a rare mineral, antlerite was found to be the primary ore of the oxidised zones in several copper mines across the world, including the Chuquicamata mine in Chile, and the Antler mine in Arizona, US from which it takes its name. It is chemically and optically similar in many respects to other copper minerals such as malachite and brochantite, though it can be distinguished from the former by a lack of effervescence in hydrochloric acid.

Antlerite is a common corrosion product on bronze sculptures located in urban areas, where atmospheric sulfur dioxide (a common pollutant) is present. Antlerite forms mainly in sheltered areas where weathering is low, which permits accumulation of copper ions and enhancement in the acidity of water films. In exposed areas, the main corrosion product is brochantite.

References

Copper(II) minerals
Sulfate minerals
Orthorhombic minerals
Minerals in space group 62